Wolfsberger AC is an Austrian football club based in Wolfsberg, Carinthia. During the 2013–14 campaign, they competed in the Austrian Bundesliga and the Austrian Cup.

Austrian Bundesliga

League table 

Wolfsberger AC seasons
Austrian football clubs 2013–14 season